"Devil with a Blue Dress On" (also known as "Devil with the Blue Dress") is a song written by Shorty Long and William "Mickey" Stevenson, first performed by Long and released as a single in 1964. A later version recorded by Mitch Ryder and The Detroit Wheels in 1966 peaked at No. 4 on the U.S. Billboard Hot 100.

Song information
"Devil with the Blue Dress" was originally released as Shorty Long's debut single on Motown in 1964, but the single failed to chart. The song describes a femme fatale in a blue dress and not an actual devil.

Two years later, Mitch Ryder and The Detroit Wheels recorded the song at Bell Sound Studios in New York City as a medley with an original arrangement of Little Richard's "Good Golly, Miss Molly". Their version was notably more up-tempo than Long's more blues-influenced rendition. Reaching No. 4 on the Hot 100, their version of the track would end up becoming their most well-known and highest charting hit in the United States. Rolling Stone Magazine ranked it No. 428 on their list of Top 500 Songs of All Time.

Later versions
"Devil with a Blue Dress On" was also recorded by Pratt & McClain, who are best known for the theme from the television series Happy Days. Bruce Springsteen's version of the song was part of the No Nukes concert album in 1980, and he has performed it regularly in concert from the 1970s to the present as part of his Detroit Medley. A Spanish language version of the song was recorded by Los Lobos and released on the Eating Raoul film soundtrack in 1982.  The Duke University basketball pep band plays this song during Blue Devil home games and after Blue Devil victories at Cameron Indoor Stadium in Durham, North Carolina. A version of the song was recorded by Nicholas O'Har for the 1990 spoof of The Exorcist, Repossessed.

References

1964 singles
1966 singles
Songs written by William "Mickey" Stevenson
Motown singles
Shorty Long songs
Mitch Ryder songs
1964 songs
Song recordings produced by Bob Crewe
Songs written by Shorty Long